The 2011–12 UCI Asia Tour was the 8th season of the UCI Asia Tour. The season began on 2 October 2011 with the Tour d'Indonesia and ended on 30 September 2012 with the Tour de Brunei.

The points leader, based on the cumulative results of previous races, wears the UCI Asia Tour cycling jersey. Mehdi Sohrabi from Iran was the defending champion of the 2010–11 UCI Asia Tour. Hossein Alizadeh of Iran was crowned as the 2011–12 UCI Asia Tour champion.

Throughout the season, points are awarded to the top finishers of stages within stage races and the final general classification standings of each of the stages races and one-day events. The quality and complexity of a race also determines how many points are awarded to the top finishers, the higher the UCI rating of a race, the more points are awarded.

The UCI ratings from highest to lowest are as follows:
 Multi-day events: 2.HC, 2.1 and 2.2
 One-day events: 1.HC, 1.1 and 1.2

Events

2011

2012

Final standings

Individual classification

Team classification

Nation classification

Nation under-23 classification

External links
 

UCI Asia Tour
2012 in road cycling
2011 in road cycling
UCI
UCI